Citizens Park Station is a subway station on Line 2 of the Incheon Subway.

External links

  Station information from Incheon Transit Corporation

Metro stations in Incheon
Seoul Metropolitan Subway stations
Railway stations opened in 2016
Michuhol District
Incheon Subway Line 2